The Chief of the General Staff of the Armed Forces of the Republic of Croatia is the principal head of the Armed Forces of Croatia. The Chief of the General Staff is appointed by the President of Croatia, who is the commander-in-chief.

The incumbent Chief of the General Staff is Admiral Robert Hranj, since 1 March 2020.

List of chiefs of the general staff

Timeline

Notes

See also
 General Staff of the Armed Forces (Croatia)

References

Military of Croatia
Croatian army officers
Croatia
Croatia